The Lash is a 1934 British drama film directed by Henry Edwards and starring Lyn Harding, John Mills and Leslie Perrins. It was based on a play of the same name by Cyril Campion. A brutish millionaire horsewhips his dissolute son. The film was made as a quota quickie by Twickenham Studios, one of the largest producers of Quota films.

Cast
 Lyn Harding - Bronson Haughton 
 John Mills - Arthur Haughton 
 Joan Maude - Dora Bush 
 Leslie Perrins - Alec Larkin 
 Mary Jerrold - Margaret Haughton 
 Aubrey Mather - Col. Bush 
 D. J. Williams - Mr. Charles 
 Roy Emerton - Steve 
 Victor Stanley - Jake

References

External links

1934 films
Films directed by Henry Edwards
1934 drama films
Films shot at Twickenham Film Studios
British drama films
Quota quickies
Films set in London
British black-and-white films
1930s English-language films
1930s British films